Ghost Town Trail is a stretch of highway located in Southern Saskatchewan, Canada.  The trail coincides with Saskatchewan Highway 13 (Hwy 13) between Govenlock and Wauchope. Along this highway are 32 "ghost towns". The nearest large communities are Swift Current and Maple Creek, Saskatchewan both located on the Trans Canada Highway which runs parallel and to the north of Hwy 13.

List of ghost towns

See also 

 List of ghost towns in Saskatchewan

References 

Ghost towns in Saskatchewan